Valerie Randle is a materials engineer who specialised in electron backscatter diffraction, grain boundary engineering, and has written a number of text books on the subject  She was Welsh Woman of the Year in 1998 and in the same year was awarded the Rosenhain Award for achievements in Materials Science  by the Institute of Materials, Minerals and Mining.
In 2004 she was invited as a guest of HM the Queen to a luncheon at Buckingham Palace for the 'top 180 female achievers in the country'. From 2008 she has been included in Who's Who. as part of increasing public recognition of scientists.  She has made significant contributions in the field of materials engineering with over 150 indexed publications in the field.

Career
Randle entered Cardiff University at the age of 27 to study chemistry, and found that the metallurgy module sparked her interest in materials. She then did a PhD and eventually was awarded a Royal Society Research Fellowship which took her to Swansea University in 1992.

In 1999, she was made a professor in the Department of Metals Engineering, working within the field of microstructure of materials at Swansea University. Randle became Head of the Materials Research Centre in 2007–2009. She has published some 370 research papers and five textbooks, and given many invited lectures all over the world.

After twenty-five years at Swansea University, she retired in 2013.

As Valerie Norris she has published two novels, In the Long Run and The April Letters with Cambria Publishing.

Personal life
Valerie Randle was born in 1953 and has lived in Wales since she moved there when she was eighteen. Randle left school when was sixteen, got married at eighteen and had two children by the age of twenty. In 2013, at age sixty, she chose to take early retirement.

Publications

The Measurement of Grain Boundary Geometry (Microscopy in Materials Science), 1993.
Grain Boundary Geometry in Polycrystals, 1993.
Atlas of Backscattering Kikuchi Diffraction Patterns, 1994.  
The Role of the Coincidence Site Lattice in Grain Boundary Engineering, 1996.  
Introduction to Texture Analysis: Macrotexture, Microtexture and Orientation Mapping, 2000, 2nd edn 2009.
Microtexture Determination and its Applications, 1992, 2nd edn 2003.

References

1953 births
Welsh chemists
Welsh women chemists
Living people
Alumni of Cardiff University
Academics of Swansea University